The Promised Key, sometimes known as The Promise Key, is a 1935 Rastafari movement tract by Jamaican preacher Leonard Howell, written under Howell's Hindu pen name G. G. Maragh (for Gong Guru).

Content 
The tract bears some close similarities to an earlier (1926) writing by Fitz Balintine Pettersburg, the Royal Parchment Scroll of Black Supremacy, but omitting much of the stream of consciousness language, long opaque abbreviations, and repetition, and some content from the Holy Piby.

Some lines of The Promised Key were taken verbatim from the Royal Parchment Scroll of Black Supremacy; for example, the slogan "Gross beauty is the Queen in hell" may be found in both works, as part of a general condemnation of western aesthetics.

Most significantly, the identities of "King Alpha and Queen Omega" were changed from Fitz Balintine Pettersburg and his wife, as in the Royal Parchment Scroll, to Emperor Haile Selassie and Empress Menen Asfaw. This was one of the key innovations of the Howellites, and is today an article of faith of Rastafari.

History 
In 1933, Howell started to preach that Emperor Haile Selassie I of Ethiopia (Ras Tafari) was the Messiah, that Black people were the chosen people, and would soon be repatriated to Ethiopia. He soon attracted the attention of the colonial authorities, and was arrested in December 1934 for sedition. In March 1935 he was sentenced to two years' imprisonment, during which time he apparently wrote The Promised Key.

The pamphlet was published 1935 by the Harding Commercial Printery, Kingston with a cover featuring two crossed keys and the name of the pamphlet's putative patron, "Dr. Nnamdi Azikiwe, Editor of the African Morning Post, Accra, Gold Coast." Nnamdi Azikiwe was the editor of that newspaper at that period, but whether he had encouraged the pamphlet in any way or this was a dedication is not known.

After he was released from imprisonment he published a newspaper called The People's Voice. In 1954, his commune was raided and much literature, including copies of The Promised Key, were burned. Howell was found dead under suspicious circumstances in February 1981.

See also
 Livity

References

External links
 The Promised Key by G.G. Maragh (The Rt. Hon. Leonard Percival Howell)

Rastafarian texts
1935 non-fiction books